An Airport Line is an airport rail link providing rail transport from the airport to other parts of the city, often the central railway station.

Routes named Airport Line include:

Asia 
 Airport Line (Fukuoka)
 Airport line (Xi'an Metro), in Xi'an, China
 Airport Line, Beijing Subway in Beijing, China
 Airport Line, Guangzhou Metro
 Airport Line, Shenzhen Metro
 Airport Shuttle Line (Macao Light Transit)
 New Airport line (Beijing Subway) in Beijing, China (under construction)
 Airport Railway (MTR), or Lantau Airport Railway, refers collectively to Airport Express and Tung Chung line in Hong Kong

Oceania 
 Airport railway line, Brisbane
 Airport line, Perth
 Airport railway line, Sydney

Americas 
 Airport Line (SEPTA) in Philadelphia, Pennsylvania, US
 Airport Line (TRAX), Salt Lake City, Utah, US

Other places 
 Airport Line (Manchester Metrolink) Manchester, UK

See also
 Airport rail link
 Airport Link (disambiguation)
 List of IATA-indexed railway stations
 List of airport rail link systems
 Airport Express (disambiguation)